William "Massa" Johnston (13 September 1881 – 9 January 1951) was a New Zealand rugby union and rugby league international. He was part of the 1905 Original All Blacks tour and the professional 1907-1908 New Zealand rugby tour of Great Britain.

Early years
Johnston was an Iron worker by trade.

Rugby Football
Johnston first played senior rugby union for the Alhambra club in 1897, aged only 15. He made his début for Otago in 1903 and represented Otago again in 1904, playing in six matches in total. In 1904 he was the first player sent off in a Ranfurly Shield match as Otago went down to Wellington. He played for the South Island in 1904, 1905 and 1907.

Johnston was first chosen for the All Blacks as part of their first tour of Great Britain. This team became known as the "Originals" and was hugely successful. However, Johnston was sickly on the tour and played in only thirteen matches, missing all of the test matches. Johnston returned to the All Blacks for their 1907 tests against Australia, playing in all three matches in the series.

Rugby League
Johnston joined the professional All Blacks in their 1907–08 tour of Australia and Great Britain, returning to the two countries he had played in as an All Black. At the time of the tour Johnston was at the peak of his career and had earned respect as a forward with a clean style of play. Johnston had helped select the side and was part of the Management committee while on tour. Along with Wright, Johnston was in charge of coaching the forwards while on tour. He was also an integral part of the forward pack and played in all eight test matches. He scored tries in the second and third tests against the Northern Union but was then wrongly sent off in the first test match against Australia. However, he returned to play in the second and third test matches. In all games on tour, Johnston scored a total of five tries.

After returning to New Zealand with the touring party, Johnston then returned to Great Britain, signing with the Wigan club. In Wigan he helped the club win the Championship. Massa Johnston played right-, i.e. number 10, and scored a try in Wigan's 10-9 victory over Oldham in the 1908 Lancashire County Cup Final during the 1908–09 season at Wheater's Field, Broughton, on Saturday 19 December 1908. In mid December 1910 he moved to Warrington (Heritage № 173), he was Warrington's first player from New Zealand, and as of 2016, he is the only former All Black to play for Warrington.

Later years
After retirement Johnston moved to Australia where he was a commissionaire at the Royal Sydney Agricultural Showgrounds. He died 9 January 1951 in Sydney.

References

External links
 
Massa Johnston Wigan Warriors, Accessed 17 August 2009.

1881 births
1951 deaths
Dual-code rugby internationals
New Zealand international rugby union players
New Zealand national rugby league team players
New Zealand rugby league players
New Zealand rugby union players
New Zealand expatriate sportspeople in England
Otago rugby union players
Rugby union players from Dunedin
Sportspeople from Dunedin
South Island rugby union players
Warrington Wolves players
Wigan Warriors players
Grafton Athletic players
Rugby league second-rows